Dagmar Kersten (born 28 October 1970) is a German former gymnast. She represented East Germany at the 1988 Olympic Games, winning a silver medal on the uneven bars, and a bronze medal in the team event. In 1985, she won four medals at the World Championships, including silver on the bars and bronze in the all-around. She was awarded the Patriotic Order of Merit.

Career
Kersten won a bronze medal on the vault at the 1985 European Championships, where she also finished fifth in the all-around and sixth on the balance beam. At the 1985 World Championships in Montreal, she won a bronze medal in the team event, and a bronze medal in the all-around behind joint winners Oksana Omelianchik and Elena Shushunova of the Soviet Union. She also made all four apparatus finals, winning silver on bars behind GDR teammate Gabriele Fahnrich, and a bronze on the vault. She was sixth on floor and eighth on beam.

Without her knowledge, Kersten was part of the East German doping program. In 1985 she suffered a serious spine injury and had to stop training. As part of her recovery treatment she was prescribed Oral Turinabol, an anabolic steroid. Her physician, Dr. Bernd Pansold, was later convicted in 1998 for the procurement of drugs to minors. Before the 1988 Olympics she was administered other performance-enhancing drugs under disguise of nutrition supplements.

At the 1988 Olympics in Seoul, Kersten won two medals; bronze in the team event, followed by a silver medal on bars behind Romanian Daniela Silivas. She also finished sixth in the vault final and eighth in the all-around.

After German reunification, Kersten moved to Stuttgart and worked at the Swabian Gymnastics Federation. Until 2002 she coached the German junior team.  Later she worked as a speaker of the Lower Saxony Gymnastics Federation and a coach for an acrobatic show, which included her daughter Alina. She also holds second dan in taekwondo and teaches martial arts. Her son Erik is a taekwondo practitioner.

Competitive history

References

External links

Dagmar Kersten. gymn-forum.net
Video

1970 births
Living people
People from Altdöbern
People from Bezirk Cottbus
German female artistic gymnasts
Sportspeople from Brandenburg
Olympic gymnasts of East Germany
Gymnasts at the 1988 Summer Olympics
Olympic silver medalists for East Germany
Olympic bronze medalists for East Germany
Olympic medalists in gymnastics
World champion gymnasts
Medalists at the World Artistic Gymnastics Championships
Medalists at the 1988 Summer Olympics
Recipients of the Patriotic Order of Merit in silver
20th-century German women